Deliktaş is a village in Kangal district of Sivas Province, Turkey. It is situated between Ulaş and Kangal towns, east of the state highway . The population of Deliklitaş is 265 as of 2011.

References

Villages in Kangal District